The Universal Beijing Resort, commonly known as Universal Beijing, is a theme park and entertainment resort complex based in Beijing, China. Invite-only test operation started on September 1, 2021, and the full operation started from September 20, 2021.

The resort is operated by Universal Destinations & Experiences. It is owned by NBCUniversal, a division of Comcast, and Beijing Shouhuan Cultural Tourism Investment.

Once completed, Universal Beijing Resort will consist of two theme parks (Universal Studios Beijing and a second planned theme park), a water park, a shopping, dining and entertainment complex (Universal CityWalk Beijing), and six hotels.

History
In February 2009, Shanghai Securities News reported that Universal Studios was close to winning approval from China's government to build a theme park in Beijing. Construction of Universal Beijing Resort began on 28 October 2016. Construction of Phase 1 of Universal Beijing Resort completed in April 2021, and opened on September 20, 2021. Phase 2 of Universal Beijing Resort is planned to open in 2025.

Theme parks and main areas

Universal Studios Beijing
Universal Studios Beijing is the resort's flagship park and opened as part of phase one.

There are seven themed areas in the park:

 Hollywood
 Jurassic World: Isla Nublar
 Waterworld
 Kung Fu Panda: Land of Awesomeness
 The Wizarding World of Harry Potter
 Transformers: Metrobase
 Minion Land

Second theme park
A later phase of Universal Beijing Resort includes plans for a second theme park which has not started to be built yet. The theme park will be located adjacent to Universal Studios Beijing.

Universal CityWalk Beijing 

Universal CityWalk acts as the gateway to Universal Beijing's theme parks. The entertainment, dining and retail complex includes stores and restaurants and is located between the parking and transit station and the theme park and waterpark entrances. CityWalk opened on September 2, 2021 as part of the resort's first phase without entrance fee. A variety of shops, dining, and entertainment is slated to be included in the complex, including:

 Universal CityWalk Cinema: Beijing's largest IMAX venue, with 11 theaters and over 2,000 seats. 
 Cutie Cone's Ice Cream
 Neon Street Hawkers
 CityWalk Wubei Craft Food And Beer
 CityWalk Red Oven Pizza Bakery
 The Cowfish Sushi Burger Bar
 Kakao Friends
 POP MART
 Toothsome Chocolate Emporium & Savory Feast Kitchen.
 Bubba Gump Shrimp Company
 Peet's Coffee
 Grandma's Travel Home
 Universal Studios Store

Water park
A later phase of Universal Beijing Resort includes plans for a waterpark.

Hotels
The first phase of Universal Beijing Resort features two official on-site hotels which are located in close proximity to the Universal Beijing theme parks.

Transportation

Subway

Universal Resort station of Beijing Subway, on Batong line and Line 7 opened on August 26, 2021.

Bus
589 and T116 were extended to Universal Beijing Resort on August 26, 2021.

References

External links

Official Resort Site

Universal Parks & Resorts attractions by name
Amusement parks in China
Buildings and structures in Tongzhou District, Beijing
2021 establishments in China